In mathematics, the term Beurling algebra is used for different algebras introduced by  , usually it is an algebra of periodic functions with Fourier series

Example
We may consider the algebra of those functions f where the majorants

of the  Fourier coefficients an are summable.  In other words

Example
We may consider a weight function w on  such that

in which case 
is a unitary commutative Banach algebra.

These algebras are closely related to the Wiener algebra.

References

Fourier series
Algebras